Stephen James Nogosek (born January 11, 1995) is an American professional baseball pitcher for the New York Mets of Major League Baseball (MLB). He made his MLB debut with the Mets in 2019.

Amateur career
Nogosek attended Woodcreek High School in Roseville, California, where he played baseball and football. As a junior for the baseball team in 2012, he pitched to an 8–0 record with a 1.02 ERA, striking out 100 batters in  innings pitched. After going undrafted out of high school in the 2013 MLB draft, he enrolled at the University of Oregon where he played college baseball for the Oregon Ducks. In 2014, as a freshman, Nogosek made 17 appearances (two starts), going 1–1 with a 2.52 ERA and a 1.37 WHIP. As a sophomore in 2015, he appeared in 39 games out of the bullpen in which he compiled a 6–3 record with a 2.02 ERA and a 1.24 WHIP. In 2015, he played collegiate summer baseball with the Orleans Firebirds of the Cape Cod Baseball League. In 2016, as a junior, he went 2–2 with a 1.11 ERA, a 0.96 WHIP, and 16 saves in 29 relief appearances and was named to the Pac-12 All-Conference Team.

Professional career

Boston Red Sox
After Nogosek's junior year, he was drafted by the Boston Red Sox in the sixth round of the 2016 MLB draft. Nogosek signed with Boston for $250,000 and made his professional debut with the Lowell Spinners before being promoted to the Greenville Drive. In twenty relief appearances between the two clubs, he went 1–2 with a 3.62 ERA. He began 2017 back with Greenville, where he was named a South Atlantic League All-Star, and was promoted to the Salem Red Sox in June.

New York Mets
On July 31, 2017, the Red Sox traded Nogosek, Jamie Callahan, and Gerson Bautista to the New York Mets in exchange for Addison Reed. He was assigned to the St. Lucie Mets and finished the year there. In 69 relief innings pitched between Greenville, Salem, and St. Lucie, he compiled a 5–5 record with a 3.52 ERA and 78 strikeouts. Nogosek began 2018 with St. Lucie (where he was named to the Florida State League All-Star Game) and was promoted to the Binghamton Rumble Ponies in June. In 39 total appearances in relief between St. Lucie and Binghamton, Nogosek went 1–1 with a 4.99 ERA and a 1.47 WHIP. After the season, he was assigned to the Scottsdale Scorpions of the Arizona Fall League.

He returned to Binghamton to begin 2019 before being promoted to the Syracuse Mets. After going 2–0 with a 0.57 ERA in 19 relief appearances between Binghamton and Syracuse, his contract was purchased on June 18 and he was called up to the major leagues. He made his major league debut on June 19 for the Mets against the Atlanta Braves, pitching 2/3 of an inning and giving up two earned runs. On December 16, 2019, the Mets designated Nogosek for assignment.

Nogosek did not play in a game in 2020 due to the cancellation of the minor league season because of the COVID-19 pandemic. He was assigned to Triple-A Syracuse to begin the 2021 season. On July 19, 2021, Nogosek was selected to the active roster.

On November 30, 2021, Nogosek was non-tendered by the Mets, making him a free agent.

On January 13, 2022, Nogosek re-signed a minor league contract with the New York Mets. On May 8, Nogosek was selected to the active rosters.

References

External links

1995 births
Living people
Sportspeople from Roseville, California
Baseball players from California
Major League Baseball pitchers
New York Mets players
Oregon Ducks baseball players
Orleans Firebirds players
Lowell Spinners players
Greenville Drive players
Salem Red Sox players
St. Lucie Mets players
Binghamton Rumble Ponies players
Syracuse Mets players
Scottsdale Scorpions players
Florida Complex League Mets players